The Women's Flat Track Derby Association's South Central Region was formed in 2008 when WFTDA changed from having just two regional tournaments (East and West), to five, made up of teams from four regions: East, North Central, South Central and West.

For 2011, the region was expanded, taking in leagues from Nebraska and New Mexico. 

WFTDA has now moved away from the Big 5 WFTDA Championships qualification tournament structure, last competed in 2012. Starting with the 2013 WFTDA season, the regions were discontinued in favour of an overall-rankings based system, and a new playoff format was created.

Current lineup

Former members

Rankings
Current Official WFTDA Regional Rankings as of January 29, 2013

Member teams unranked at this time:
 Classic City Rollergirls
 Gainesville Roller Rebels
 Magnolia Roller Vixens
 Mississippi Rollergirls

Region Champions
 2009 - Texas Rollergirls
 2010 - Kansas City Roller Warriors
 2011 - Texas Rollergirls
 2012 - Texas Rollergirls

Hydra Trophy winners produced
 2006 - Texas Rollergirls
 2007 - Kansas City Roller Warriors

South Central Region titles won by league

See also
East Region
West Region
North Central Region

References

External links
South Central Regionals Tournament